The Alliance of Asian Liberal Arts Universities (AALAU) is as a consortium of leading liberal arts universities located in countries and regions in East, South and Southeast Asia. Formed in November 2017, AALAU enable member universities to renew and reinvigorate the liberal arts education traditions and development. Its Alliance Secretariat located in Lingnan University in Hong Kong.

Overview 
Because university rankings have not been able to present teaching quality for a long time, 15 of universities with similar visions and characteristics have formed the alliance.

The founding member universities of AALAU are all well-known universities in their respective countries, their common feature is highly internationalized, high social reputation, and high education quality (high graduate achievement). Some of these members were selected as the "Top 10 Liberal Arts Colleges In Asia" by Forbes.

Membership 
The Alliance features 15 founding member universities (marking †). At present, AALAU has 28 members.

East Asia

Hong Kong 
Lingnan University †

Mainland China 
Duke Kunshan University †
East China Normal University †
Northeast Normal University
NYU Shanghai (Observer)
University of Nottingham Ningbo China †
Yuanpei College, Peking University †

Taiwan 
Fu Jen Catholic University †
National Chengchi University †
Tunghai University †

Japan 
International Christian University †
Yamanashi Gakuin University
Kyushu University
Rikkyo University
Sophia University †
The University of Tokyo †
Waseda University †

South Korea 
Dongguk University
Ewha Womans University
Kyung Hee University †
Seoul National University †
University of Seoul
Yeungnam University
Yonsei University †

South Asia

India 
Ahmedabad University
Symbiosis School for Liberal Arts

Southeast Asia

Thailand 
Chiang Mai University
Mahidol University International College

See also
Liberal arts college
Global Liberal Arts Alliance
List of higher education associations and alliances

References

External links
The Alliance of Asian Liberal Arts Universities (AALAU)

Liberal arts colleges
International college and university associations and consortia
2017 establishments in Asia